White Fleet or White fleet may refer to:

 White fleet (military vehicles), non-combat vehicles used by Australian, New Zealand, and UK military forces
 The Great White Fleet, the dispatch of US naval forces to the orient between 1907 and 1909
 White Fleet, the fleet of Portuguese fishing vessels that fished for cod on Newfoundland's Grand Banks (e.g. UAM Creoula)